Duke of Granada de Ega commonly known as Duke of Granada, is a hereditary title in the peerage of Spain accompanied by the dignity of Grandee and granted in 1729 by Philip V to Juan de Idiázquez y Eguía, who was captain general of the Royal Spanish Armies.

The title makes reference to an area near the River Ega, in Navarre.

Dukes of Granada de Ega (1729)

Juan de Idiázquez y Eguía, 1st Duke of Granada de Ega (1665-1736)
Antonio de Idiáquez y Garnica, 2nd Duke of Granada de Ega (1686-1754), eldest son of Pedro de Idiázquez y Eguía, brother of the 1st Duke
Ignacio de Idiáquez y Aznárez Garro, 3rd Duke of Granada de Ega (1713-1769), eldest son of the 2nd Duke
Francisco de Borja de Idiáquez y Palafox, 4th Duke of Granada de Ega (d. 1817), eldest son of the 3rd Duke
Francisco Javier de Idiáquez y Carvajal, 5th Duke of Granada de Ega (1778-1848), eldest son of the 4th Duke
Francisco Javier Azlor de Aragón e Idiáquez, 6th Duke of Granada de Ega (1842-1919), eldest son of María de la Concepción de Idiázquez y del Corral, eldest daughter of the 5th Duke
José Antonio Azlor de Aragón y Hurtado de Zaldívar, 7th Duke of Granada de Ega (1873-1960), eldest son of the 6th Duke
María del Carmen Azlor de Aragón y Guillamas, 8th Duchess of Granada de Ega (1912-1988), eldest daughter of the 7th Duke
Juan Alfonso Martos y Azlor de Aragón, 9th Duke of Granada de Ega (b. 1942), eldest son of the 8th Duchess

See also
List of dukes in the peerage of Spain
List of current Grandees of Spain

References

Bibliography
 

Dukedoms of Spain
Grandees of Spain
Lists of dukes
Lists of Spanish nobility
Noble titles created in 1729